Raul Sevilla Manglapus (October 20, 1918 – July 25, 1999) was a prominent post–World War II Filipino politician and songwriter. He co-founded the reformist Progressive Party of the Philippines and the Christian Democratic Socialist Movement in 1968 (later renamed the National Union of Christian Democrats).

He was elected to the Senate by a landslide in 1961 and ran for president in 1965, but lost to eventual winner Ferdinand Marcos. He once again became Secretary of Foreign Affairs under President Corazon Aquino in 1987.

His name is inscribed on the wall of the Philippines' Bantayog ng mga Bayani, which honors the heroes and martyrs who fought authoritarian rule. However, Manglapus has also drawn the ire of feminist movements for his preconceived notions and controversial sexist remarks during his lifetime.

Personal life
He was married to Pacita La'O. His father was Congressman Valentin Manglapus of Ilocos Sur, and his mother the former Justina Sevilla of Malabon, Rizal.

Early life
Manglapus spent his formative years in the Ateneo de Manila. In 1939, he served as editor-in-chief of the school publication, The Guidon. It was during this time that he was acquainted with Manuel Manahan, rural reform advocate and later colleague in the Senate. In fact, Manahan served as editor-in-chief of the Guidon before Manglapus. The two became long-time friends and were later running-mates for the 1965 Presidential Elections under the Party for Philippine Progress (PPP). Manglapus graduated from the Ateneo de Manila AB '39 summa cum laude and excelled in oratory. His prize-winning oration, "In Defense of the Tao", (the Common Man), capped extraordinary scholastic achievements which earned him the respect of President Manuel L. Quezon who attended the contest for the sole purpose of hearing Manglapus speak.

During World War II Manglapus was the voice in the "Voice of Freedom" broadcasts from the beleaguered Filipino-American forces on Bataan and Corregidor, serving under Gen. Douglas MacArthur. An authentic hero, he was tortured to the brink of death by the Japanese in Fort Santiago.

Political career
He first came to prominence from his association with Ramon Magsaysay, the one-time mechanic turned populist politician who remains perhaps the most popular Filipino president in history. In 1953, Manglapus composed for the presidential candidate Magsaysay the catchy campaign jingle Mambo Magsaysay, which became widely popular and is credited in some quarters as aiding immensely in the election of Magsaysay.

Manglapus remained, until the end of his life, a prolific composer and musical performer. His compositions, distinctive for their martial lilt, included, besides, a college rallying march, Blue Eagle the King, whose music were later borrowed and adapted by a Jesuit school in the United States.

Manglapus also wrote a musical comedy, Manifest Destiny: Yankee Panky, a parody of America's belated venture into colonialism. He was also the leader of the Executive Combo Band, a jazz band composed mainly of his peers. They performed for the Pope at the Vatican in 1995. He jammed with jazz giant Duke Ellington, and prominent jazz-inclined politicians such as U.S. President Bill Clinton, Amelita Ramos—wife of President Fidel V. Ramos, and King Bhumibol Adulyadej of Thailand. Later in life, Manglapus would serve as chairman of the Filipino Society of Composers, Authors and Publishers (FILSCAP).

Manglapus, in some regards, stood apart from his political peers, though not always to his advantage. A linguist and a snappy dresser, he sometimes conveyed the persona of an upstart elitist, an image which was not helped by a fluent American-tinged accent hallmarked by his education at the Ateneo de Manila, which awarded him an honorary doctor of laws degree in 1965. The lack of a traditional political machinery to support him contributed to early electoral defeats. He also did not have plenty of allies, often distancing himself from Aquino, Tañada, and the other senators due to his elitist personality, though they did cooperate after martial law ended. Nonetheless, by the time of the presidency of Ferdinand Marcos, he had attained prominence and stability in the Filipino political arena.

Fortuitously, Manglapus was on a speaking engagement in the United States when Marcos declared martial law in 1972. Marcos refused to allow Manglapus' wife and children to join him in exile, and they were forced to flee the country by the backdoor, leapfrogging even by small raft to freedom. Manglapus remained in exile for 14 years, dissuaded by an outstanding warrant of arrest should he return to the country. Even in exile, Manglapus remained as one of the Filipino opposition leaders after Benigno Aquino Jr., Jovito Salonga and Sen. Jose W. Diokno, the father of human rights. During his years as an expatriate, Manglapus founded the Movement for a Free Philippines (MFP). He served as president of Democracy International, an organization of exiled world leaders seeking the restoration of democratic institutions in their respective countries, and president of the Washington-based International Center for Development Policy from 1981 to 1986. In an interview in March 1981, he voiced his strong revulsion of Marcos' violation of the Constitution and his manipulation of the political scene as a ploy to the declaration of martial law as a means to entrench himself and his cronies:

"Martial law pure and simple has been a facade masking the exploitation of our people and their natural resources by Marcos, his family and close friends. Any benefits, and there have been few, that have reached the people have been accidental and not the result of deliberate martial law policy."

Return to the Philippines
Manglapus immediately returned to the Philippines upon the ouster of Marcos and the accession to the presidency of Corazon Aquino in 1986. The Aquino years provided a second lease in political life for the ageing statesman. He was elected to the Philippine Senate in 1987, but resigned before his term expired to serve once again as Secretary of Foreign Affairs for President Aquino.

His tenure as Foreign Affairs Secretary was overshadowed by a remark he made during a Senate hearing on the rape of Filipina domestics in Kuwait during the 1990 Iraqi invasion. He quipped, to general outrage, that if rape were inevitable, one should relax and enjoy it. It was on surface a flippant remark, but deeper meaning attached to it in terms of the need for the steeling of character, not the common virtue of Philippine lawmakers with lesser lights, many of whom were duplicitous participants in the rape of Philippine democracy and its economy, the drastic decline of the peso, the needless suffering inflicted on its people. Despite the subsequent political firestorm, Manglapus weathered widespread calls for his resignation.

After the election of his close associate Fidel V. Ramos as president in 1992, Manglapus lowered his political profile, while retaining powerful positions such as chairman of the Philippine National Oil Company and the Lakas-National Union of Christian Democrats (NUCD), Ramos' political party. Manglapus had established the Christian Democratic Socialist Movement in 1968, a party which eventually reorganized as the NUCD. Manglapus fostered ties with the other Christian Democratic parties in the world, such as that in Germany.

As senator and government official, he promoted land reform and battled corruption. He was also a foremost nationalist and human rights advocate. Commenting on his unsuccessful bid for the presidency, a writer wrote: "Raúl Manglapus was one of the leading Filipino intellectuals of his generation and a politician with wide appeal. It was the Philippines' misfortune that Ferdinand Marcos, equally able but lacking in principles, won the presidency rather than someone like Manglapus.
A prolific writer and political analyst, his book written during his last year of exile,"Will of the People: Exploring Original Democracy in Non-Western Societies", one of many articles, tracts and books he had already written, transcends national interests and traces the origins of democratic traditions and institutions which prove globally relevant to our times.

Death
 
Manglapus died on July 25, 1999 from throat cancer.

References

Official Philippine Senate Historical Profile
Land of Bondage, Land of the Free (bughaw.com)

Further readingA Pen For Democracy. Raúl S. Manglapus and Lilia Ramos-de León. 1983. MPF. Washington, D.C.Faith in the Filipino: the ripening revolution: a collection of speeches. Raul S. Manglapus, ed. 1961. Regal Publishing. Manila, Philippines.Japan in Southeast Asia: Collision Course. Raúl S. Manglapus and Thomas L. Hughes. 1976. Carnegie Endowment for International Peace. New York.Land of Bondage, Land of the Free. Raúl S. Manglapus. 1963. La Solidaridad. Manila.Philippines, the Silenced Democracy. Raúl S. Manglapus. 1976. Orbis Books. New York.Will of the People: Exploring Original Democracy in Non-Western Societies''. Raúl S. Manglapus. 1987. Greenwood Press. Westport, CT.

1918 births
1999 deaths
Ateneo de Manila University alumni
Candidates in the 1965 Philippine presidential election
Corazon Aquino administration cabinet members
Deaths from cancer in the Philippines
Deaths from esophageal cancer
Filipino musicians
Filipino political party founders
Individuals honored at the Bantayog ng mga Bayani
Lakas–CMD (1991) politicians
People from Manila
Progressive Party (Philippines) politicians
Secretaries of Foreign Affairs of the Philippines
Senators of the 5th Congress of the Philippines
Senators of the 6th Congress of the Philippines
Senators of the 8th Congress of the Philippines
University of Santo Tomas alumni